In abstract algebra, the sedenions form a 16-dimensional noncommutative and nonassociative algebra over the real numbers, usually represented by the capital letter S, boldface  or blackboard bold . They are obtained by applying the Cayley–Dickson construction to the octonions, and as such the octonions are isomorphic to a subalgebra of the sedenions. Unlike the octonions, the sedenions are not an alternative algebra. Applying the Cayley–Dickson construction to the sedenions yields a 32-dimensional algebra, sometimes called the 32-ions or trigintaduonions. It is possible to continue applying the Cayley–Dickson construction arbitrarily many times.

Arithmetic 

Like octonions, multiplication of sedenions is neither commutative nor associative.
But in contrast to the octonions, the sedenions do not even have the property of being alternative.
They are also flexible.

which form a basis of the vector space of sedenions. Every sedenion can be represented in the form

Addition and subtraction are defined by the addition and subtraction of corresponding coefficients and multiplication is distributive over addition.

Like other algebras based on the Cayley–Dickson construction, the sedenions contain the algebra they were constructed from.

The sedenions have a multiplicative identity element  and multiplicative inverses, but they are not a division algebra because they have zero divisors. All hypercomplex number systems after sedenions that are based on the Cayley–Dickson construction also contain zero divisors.

A sedenion multiplication table is shown below:

Sedenion properties 
From the above table, we can see that:

 and

Anti-associative 
The sedenions are not fully anti-associative. The following 5-cycle shows that these five relations cannot all be anti-associative.

In particular, in the table above, using  and  the last expression associates.

Quaternionic subalgebras 
The 35 triads that make up this specific sedenion multiplication table with the 7 triads of the octonions used in creating the sedenion through the Cayley–Dickson construction shown in bold:

The binary representations of the indices of these triples bitwise XOR to 0.

{ {1, 2, 3}, {1, 4, 5}, {1, 7, 6}, {1, 8, 9}, {1, 11, 10}, {1, 13, 12}, {1, 14, 15}, 
{2, 4, 6}, {2, 5, 7}, {2, 8, 10}, {2, 9, 11}, {2, 14, 12}, {2, 15, 13}, {3, 4, 7}, 
{3, 6, 5}, {3, 8, 11}, {3, 10, 9}, {3, 13, 14}, {3, 15, 12}, {4, 8, 12}, {4, 9, 13},  
{4, 10, 14}, {4, 11, 15}, {5, 8, 13}, {5, 10, 15}, {5, 12, 9}, {5, 14, 11}, {6, 8, 14},  
{6, 11, 13}, {6, 12, 10}, {6, 15, 9}, {7, 8, 15}, {7, 9, 14}, {7, 12, 11}, {7, 13, 10} }

The list of 84 sets of zero divisors , where
:

Applications 
 showed that the space of pairs of norm-one sedenions that multiply to zero is homeomorphic to the compact form of the exceptional Lie group G2.  (Note that in his paper, a "zero divisor" means a pair of elements that multiply to zero.)

 demonstrated that the three generations of leptons and quarks that are associated with unbroken gauge symmetry  can be represented using the algebra of the complexified sedenions . In particular, they note that tensor products between normed division algebras generate zero divisors akin to those inside , where for  the lack of alternativity and associativity does not affect the construction of minimal left ideals since their underlying split basis requires only two basis elements to be multiplied together, in-which associativity or alternativity are uninvolved. Still, these ideals constructed from an adjoint algebra of left actions of the algebra on itself remain associative, alternative, and isomorphic to a Clifford algebra. Furthermore, these three complexified octonion subalgebras are not independent; they share a common  subalgebra, which the authors note could form a theoretical basis for CKM and PMNS matrices that, respectively, describe quark mixing and neutrino oscillations.

Sedenion neural networks provide  a means of efficient and compact expression in machine learning applications and have been used in solving multiple time-series and traffic forecasting problems.

See also 
 Pfister's sixteen-square identity
 Split-complex number

Notes

References 

 
 
 
 
 

L. S. Saoud and H. Al-Marzouqi, "Metacognitive Sedenion-Valued Neural Network and its Learning Algorithm," in IEEE Access, vol. 8, pp. 144823-144838, 2020, doi: 10.1109/ACCESS.2020.3014690.

Hypercomplex numbers
Non-associative algebras